Alex Martin may refer to:

Alex Martin (racing driver) (born 1987), British racing driver

Alex Martin (cricketer) (born 1992), English former first-class cricketer

Álex Martín (footballer) (born 1998), Spanish footballer

Alex Martin (actress) (born 1973), American actress and film producer

Martin, Alex